The Mexico City Marathon is an annual road running event over the marathon distance  which is held on the streets of Mexico City in late August or early September that in 2018 received IAAF Gold Label Status.

History
The race was established in 1983 at a time of growing interest in marathons in the country – the Independencia Marathon had been launched three years earlier and the Monterrey Marathon had been run over the full distance in 1982. The winner of the first women's race, María del Carmen Cárdenas, later became one of the first female Olympic marathon runners for Mexico. The competition was mostly national in nature until the turn of the 21st century, when more elite international runners began to compete, and win, at the race. Eileen Claugus of the United States was the first foreign winner in 1987, and Ethiopia's Tesfaye Tafa became the first male foreign winner two years later. Since 2002 only one Mexican man has won the race, and no Mexican woman has won since 2010.

The men's course record for the event is held by Kenyan. Hillary Kimaiyo Kipchirchir won in a record time of 2:12:10 hours in 2010, while the women's course record for the event is held by Peruvian. Gladys Tejeda's time of 2:36:16 hours in 2017.  The most successful athlete of the competition is María del Carmen Díaz, who took four wins from 1993 to 1997. Course record holder Hillary Kimaiyo Kipchirchir is the most successful man, with three wins to his name. Alene Shewarge Amara and Patricia Jardon also have won the race on three occasions.

The event features several races, besides the elite marathon, including a marathon road bicycle race. The marathon running event itself declares several winners other than the elite race, based on age category and also disability. At the 2015 edition some 35,000 people took part in the event, coming from 60 countries.

It is one of two annual marathons to have been held in the Mexican capital, alongside the Trabajadores Marathon, which took place in April from 1986 to 2005.

The 2020 edition of the race was cancelled due to the coronavirus pandemic, with all registrants given the option of obtaining a full refund or transferring their entry to 2021 or to another runner for 2021.

Course 

The start point of the race is near Hemiciclo a Juárez in Alameda Central. The course takes a south to north loop on Paseo de la Reforma then follows another loop back, passing Torre Mayor twice. The final part of the race follows Avenida de los Insurgentes westwards to reach the end-point at Estadio Olímpico Universitario. The course overall is slightly uphill with a total rise of around 65 metres. It is largely flat at the beginning, has a hilly section between 10 km and 25 km and ends with an incline in the final ten kilometres.

Winners 
Key:

Wheelchair division

Visually impaired division

Multiple wins

By country

Notes

References

External links
Official website

Athletics competitions in Mexico
Sports competitions in Mexico City
Marathons in Mexico
1983 establishments in Mexico
Recurring sporting events established in 1983
Paseo de la Reforma